Hugo F. Rodriguez Jr. is an American diplomat who has served as the principal deputy assistant secretary in the Bureau of Consular Affairs since February 2023. Rodriguez is the designate to serve as United States ambassador to Nicaragua after confirmation by the U.S. Senate in 2022, but he was rejected publicly by the government of Nicaragua before and after his confirmation. He has previously served as a senior advisor in the Bureau of Western Hemisphere Affairs.

Early life and education 
Rodriguez was born in Philadelphia. He earned a Bachelor of Arts degree in economics from Hampden–Sydney College and a Master of Business Administration from the University of Virginia Darden School of Business.

Career 
A career United States Foreign Service officer, Rodriguez has served in missions in Italy, Peru, Mexico, Paraguay, and others. He joined the Bureau of Western Hemisphere Affairs in January 2019, serving as deputy assistant secretary and later acting principal deputy assistant secretary. He resigned from these positions in December 2021.

On February 13, 2023, he became the Principal Deputy Assistant Secretary in the Bureau of Consular Affairs.

Nomination to be United States ambassador to Nicaragua
On May 6, 2022, President Joe Biden nominated Rodriguez to be the next ambassador to Nicaragua. On July 28, 2022, the Nicaraguan government announced that it had withdrawn their approval of Rodriguez's nomination to the ambassadorship after he made comments criticizing the regime during his confirmation hearings. Despite this, Rodriguez was confirmed by the Senate on September 29, 2022. However, on September 30, the Vice President of Nicaragua Rosario Murillo reaffirmed their July position and said Rodriguez would not be admitted to Nicaragua.

Awards and recognitions
Rodriguez has won numerous State Department performance awards.

Personal life
Rodriguez speaks Italian, French and Spanish.

References

External links

Living people
Hampden–Sydney College alumni
University of Virginia Darden School of Business alumni
United States Foreign Service personnel
United States Department of State officials
American diplomats
People from Philadelphia
Year of birth missing (living people)